Misan may refer to:

 Misan, Iran, a village in East Azerbaijan Province, Iran
 Misan Province, Iraq
 Misan football club, an Iraqi football team
 Igor Mišan (born 1990), Bosnian Serb footballer
 University of Misan, in Amarah, Maysan, Iraq
 Ministry of Health (Spain) (Ministerio de Sanidad or MISAN)